The 2002 24 Hours of Le Mans was an automobile endurance race held for Le Mans Prototype and Grand Touring cars  from 15 to 16 June 2002 at the Circuit de la Sarthe, close by Le Mans, France. It was the 70th running of the event, as organized by the automotive group, the Automobile Club de l'Ouest (ACO) since 1923. A test day was held five weeks prior to the race on 5 May. The No. 1 Audi Sport Team Joest car of Tom Kristensen, Frank Biela and Emanuele Pirro won the race overall and Audi's third consecutive victory in Le Mans, extending back to the 2000 event.

Background and circuit changes

The 2002 24 Hours of Le Mans was the 70th edition of the event and took place at the  Circuit de la Sarthe road racing track close to Le Mans, France, from 15 to 16 June. The race was first held in 1923 after the automotive journalist Charles Faroux, the Automobile Club de l'Ouest (ACO) general secretary Georges Durand and the industrialist Emile Coquile agreed to hold a test of vehicle reliability and durability. It is considered the world's most prestigious sports car race and is part of the Triple Crown of Motorsport.

After the Bugatti Circuit was reconstructed, the organisers of the race and automotive group, the ACO, announced improvements requested to the circuit by the governing body of motorcycle racing, the Fédération Internationale de Motocyclisme, between the Dunlop Bridge and the entry to the Esses complex of corners. New gravel traps were also added to the area. Construction cost ₣15 million and took place from November 2001 to February 2002.

Entries
The ACO received 96 applications by the deadline for entries on 22 February 2002. It granted 48 invitations to the 24 Hours of Le Mans and entries were divided between the LMP900 (Le Mans Prototype 900), LMGTP (Le Mans Grand Touring Prototype), LMP675 (Le Mans Prototype 675), LMGTS (Le Mans Grand Touring Sports) and LMGT (Le Mans Grand Touring) categories. A special invitation category was created by the ACO for the Panoz and Lola prototypes fielded by the DAMS team to allow for the filming of the 2003 film Michel Vaillant by Luc Besson.

Automatic entries 
Eight automatic entry invitations were earned by teams that won their class in the 2001 24 Hours of Le Mans, or victories in two rounds of the worldwide Le Mans Series that the ACO designed as "qualifying events" – the Petit Le Mans of the American Le Mans Series and the 1000km of Estoril of the defunct European Le Mans Series. They were Audi Sport Team Joest in the LMP900 class, Corvette Racing in the LMGTs category and Seikel Motorsport in the LMGT class. Audi and Corvette also earned berths for securing victories in their respective classes at the Petit Le Mans race and Pescarolo Sport of the LMP900 category, GTS entrants Ray Mallock Limited and Freisinger Motorsport in the LMGT class were granted invitations for winning the 1000 km of Estoril. Prototype Technology Group were the only team not to accept their automatic invitation as the team's car supplier BMW had withdrawn from the American Le Mans Series due to a technological dispute.

Entry list and reserves 
On 21 March 2002, the selection committee of the ACO announced the full 50-car entry list for Le Mans, plus six reserves. In addition from the eight guaranteed entries, 17 regular season entries came from the American Le Mans Series, while the remainder of the field was filled with one-off entries only competing at Le Mans. Team Rafanelli announced that their Ferrari 550M would be withdrawn on 26 March, after the team decided to focus on the GTS championship in the American Le Mans Series. This promoted the  27 Chamberlain Motorsport MG-Lola EX257 to the race entry as a result and increased the number of LMP675 entries to seven. All of the reserve entries were deleted from the entry list on 31 May.

Testing

A mandatory pre-Le Mans testing day split into two daytime sessions of four hours each was held at the circuit on 5 May, involving all 48 entries as well as all six reserve cars. The two four-hour sessions were held in cold and overcast weather conditions. Audi set the day's pace with a lap of 3 minutes and 30.296 seconds from the No. 2 Audi R8 of Rinaldo Capello in the final ten minutes of the second session, followed by Stéphane Sarrazin in the No. 14 Team Oreca Dallara SP1 in second. Slower traffic restricted Tom Kristensen's No. 1 car to third and his teammate Michael Krumm put the No. 3 vehicle in fourth. The No. 27 MG-Lola EX257 driven by Mark Blundell was fifth overall, and he was in front of the sole LMGTP entry, Eric van de Poele's No. 8 Bentley EXP Speed 8 in sixth overall. In the LMGTS class, Tomáš Enge, driving the No. 58 Prodrive Ferrari 550-GTS Maranello, set the category's fastest time and he was more than two seconds faster than Christophe Bouchut in the No. 50  Larbre Compétition-Chereau-entered Chrysler Viper GTS-R. The No. 81 The Racer's Group-fielded Porsche 911 GT3-RS was the fastest car in the LMGT category, followed by the PK Sport Ltd. Porsche in second and the third-placed JMB Racing Ferrari 360 Modena.

Qualifying

There were eight hours of qualifying divided into four two-hour sessions available to all the entrants on 12 and 13 June. During the sessions, all entrants were required to set a time within 110 percent of the fastest lap established by the fastest vehicle in each category to qualify for the race. Jan Lammers' No. 16 Racing for Holland Dome S101 set an early pace of 3 minutes and 31.355 seconds just before the end of the first qualifying session's first hour. The lap was not bettered by any other car, giving the entry provisional pole position. The fastest Audi R8 was the No. 1 car of Kristensen who was 0.414 seconds slower in second but more than three seconds faster than Capello in third and Krumm in fourth. Olivier Beretta was the fastest Dallara in fifth and van de Poele put the No. 8 Bentley in sixth. A red flag was necessitated when the No. 26 MG-Lola EX257 of Jonny Kane had an engine failure on the Mulsanne Straight and his team changed engines. The first two positions in the LMP675 class were occupied by Warren Hughes and Julian Bailey's MGs, with the No. 28 ROC Organisation Course Reynard 2KQ-LM driven by Mark Smithson in third. Rickard Rydell in the Prodrive Ferrari led the LMGTS category by more than four seconds over the leading Corvette of Andy Pilgrim and the LMGT class was topped by The Racer's Group Porsche 911 of Lucas Luhr. JMB Racing's No. 71 Ferrari got beached in the gravel trap at the Dunlop Curve, bringing an early end to the session with ten minutes to go.

The second qualifying session had Capello go faster than Lammers' time from the first session to take the provisional pole position with a lap of 3 minutes and 30.347 seconds in its eighth minute. Kristensen remained in second as he improved the No. 1 car's best lap. He demoted the No. 16 Racing for Holland Dome of Lammers to third overall although the latter entry bettered its first session time. The MG-Lola crashed into a barrier beside the circuit and damaged its steering arm. Blundell drove the car back to the pit lane for extensive repairs to it. Four minutes before the conclusion of the session, Andy Wallace's No. 8 Bentley and a slower car made contact on the approach to Indianapolis corner, causing the Bentley to run into the trackside gravel trap. Yannick Dalmas in the No. 5 Audi Sport Japan Team Goh car lost his right rear wing endplate from possibly hitting debris on the Mulsanne Straight and the car launched airborne before resting against a barrier. In LMGTS, Oliver Gavin's Chevrolet Corvette C5-R and Alain Menu in the Prodrive Ferrari battled for the provisional pole position with Menu ending the session top of all the entrants in the category with a time of 3 minutes and 56.730 seconds. The LMGT class continued to be led by The Racer's Group Porsche 911.

After the second session, the No. 16 Racing for Holland Dome had all of its lap times deleted due to a fuel infringement caused by possibly its fuel tank not being extensively cleaned. Teams running with more powerful engines for qualifying stopped utilising them and installed the power units they would use for the race in order to comply with an ACO regulation that forbade teams changing engines before the final qualifying session and the race. The 13 June's first qualifying session had Capello improve provisional pole position with a 3 minutes and 29.905 seconds lap that he set late in the session and broke the overall lap record held by Martin Brundle in a Toyota GT-One since the 1999 race. He was followed by Kristensen's No. 2 Audi in second after the latter was delayed by a slower car and Sarrazin's third-placed No. 14 Team Oreca Dallara though he aborted his first timed lap due to traffic. The No. 3 Audi remained in fourth place, and Blundell's No. 27 MG-Lola maintained fifth though his engine failed at the first chicane on the Mulsanne Straight. Dalmas' session was ended early with an electrical failure that caused him to abandon his Audi at the side of the track. Although it stopped on its first lap with a transmission fault, the Prodrive Ferrari continued to lead the LMGTS category, and The Racer's Group Porsche maintained the LMGT class lead despite Luhr making a driver error that put the car into the gravel trap at the Dunlop Chicane, and a broken water sealant when Kevin Buckler was driving the vehicle. The session was stopped halfway through for ten minutes to allow marshals to dry a large amount of spilled oil at the Ford Chicanes.

As temperatures cooled in the final qualifying session, over a third of the field improved their fastest laps, but Capello's pole position time was unchallenged. Kristensen led the session in the No. 2 Audi with a lap of 3 minutes and 30.219 seconds while his teammate Krumm moved the No. 3 car to third place as the Audis concentrated on race testing. It was Audi's third consecutive pole position at Le Mans, extending back to the 2000 event. Franck Montagny and Sarrazin qualified the No. 14 Oreca in fourth and Lammer qualified the Racing for Holland Dome in fifth. The No. 27 MG-Lola fell to sixth as it did not take part in the session as it underwent a change of engine and Beretta put the No. 15 Team Oreca Dallara in seventh. The No. 11 Panoz LMP01 Evo, driven by Bryan Herta, caused the session's only stoppage halfway through the session for ten minutes when the car caught fire and stopped at the Dunlop Chicane. Enge earned Prodrive the LMGTS pole position by improving the class' fastest lap time to a 3 minutes and 54.091 seconds although he damaged the rear of his Ferrari in a crash against a trackside wall. The Racer's Group Porsche 911 of Luhr lowered its best lap to 4 minutes and 10.803 seconds and took pole position in the LMGT category.

Qualifying results
Pole positions in each class are denoted in bold and by a ‡. The fastest time set by each entry is denoted in gray.

Race
The 2002 edition saw Audi Sport Team Joest, with drivers Frank Biela, Tom Kristensen, and Emanuele Pirro, taking their third victory not only as a team and manufacturer, but also as a driving team, marking the first time a set of three drivers won the event three years in a row.

Official results

Statistics
 Fastest Lap – #1 Audi Sport Team Joest – 3:33.483
 Distance – 5118.75 km
 Average Speed – 213.068 km/h
 Highest Trap Speed – Audi R8 – 340 km/h (race), Dome Judd S101 Racing for Holland – 340 km/h (race)

References

Le Mans
Le Mans
24 Hours of Le Mans races
Le Mans